Praegmelina is an extinct genus of crustacean in the order Amphipoda. It existed during the middle Miocene period.

References

External links
 Praegmelina at the Paleobiology Database

Gammaridea
Miocene crustaceans